These are the results of the men's 4 × 100 metres relay event at the 1995 World Championships in Athletics in Gothenburg, Sweden.

Medalists

Results

Heats
Qualification: First 3 of each heat (Q) and the next 4 fastest (q) qualified for the semifinals.

Semifinals
Qualification: First 4 of each heat qualified directly (Q) for the final.

Final

References
 Results
 IAAF

- Mens 4x100 Metres Relay
Relays at the World Athletics Championships